Cureggio is a comune (municipality) in the Province of Novara in the Italian region of Piedmont, located about  northeast of Turin and about  northwest of Novara.

Cureggio borders the following municipalities: Boca, Borgomanero, Cavallirio, Fontaneto d'Agogna, and Maggiora.

The town also has a railway station, served by the Santhià–Arona railway (currently in disuse).

References

External links
 Official website

Cities and towns in Piedmont